José Echenique (born November 28, 1965 in Caracas) is a retired male basketball player from Venezuela, who played as a power forward during his career. He competed for the Venezuela national basketball team at the 1990 FIBA World Championship.

Personal life
Echenique is the father of Venezuela national team member Gregory Echenique.

References

1965 births
Living people
Venezuelan men's basketball players
1990 FIBA World Championship players
Sportspeople from Caracas
Power forwards (basketball)
20th-century Venezuelan people
21st-century Venezuelan people